Joe Bush may refer to:
Bullet Joe Bush (1892–1974), Major League Baseball pitcher
Joe Bush (ghost), American ghost
Joe Bush (racing driver), NASCAR driver
Joe Bush (organ grinder), American organ grinder
Joe Bush (American football), American football coach and athletic director